The 2012 season was Pohang Steelers' thirtieth season in the K-League in South Korea. Pohang Steelers is competing K-League, Korean FA Cup and AFC Champions League.

Current squad

Out on loan

Transfer

In

Out

Coaching staff

Match results

K-League
All times are Korea Standard Time (KST) – UTC+9

[1] Round 15 Match of Incheon vs Pohang was originally K-League restricted non-attendance match.

League table

Results summary

Results by round

Korean FA Cup

AFC Champions League

Qualifying play-off

Group stage (Group E)

Squad statistics

Appearances
Statistics accurate as of match played 27 June 2012

Goals and assists

Discipline

References

Pohang Steelers
2012